Letea can mean:

Places
 Letea Forest, the oldest natural reservation in Romania
 Letea Veche, a commune in Bacău County, Romania
 Letea, Tulcea, a village in Tulcea County, Romania

Company
 Letea, a company producing paper for newspapers in Romania